Jeff Rosenstock, an American rock musician, has released five studio albums, two live albums, five extended plays (EPs), one mixtape, fifteen singles, and eleven music videos.

Albums

Studio albums

Live albums

Mixtapes

Extended plays

Singles

Music videos

References

External links
 

Alternative rock discographies
Discographies of American artists